UFC 167: St-Pierre vs. Hendricks was a mixed martial arts event held on November 16, 2013, at the MGM Grand Garden Arena in Las Vegas, Nevada, U.S.

Background
The event commemorated the organization's 20th anniversary. The main event was a UFC Welterweight Championship bout between the champion Georges St-Pierre and #1 contender Johny Hendricks.  Co-featured on the card was a light-heavyweight bout between Rashad Evans and Chael Sonnen.

Rafael Natal was briefly scheduled to face Ed Herman at the event.  However, Natal was pulled from the pairing with Herman in favor of a bout with Tim Kennedy on November 6, 2013, in the event headliner at UFC Fight Night 31.  Herman instead faced Thales Leites.

A bout between Frank Mir and Alistair Overeem was scheduled for this card, but was moved to UFC 169.

Robert Drysdale was initially scheduled to face Cody Donovan on this card. However, Drysdale was refused a fighting license by the Nevada State Athletic Commission (NSAC) after an out-of-competition drug test revealed that he had an elevated testosterone-to-epitestosterone ratio of 19.4. Donovan instead faced Gian Villante.

Vaughan Lee was expected to face Sergio Pettis at this event. However, Lee had to pull out citing an undisclosed injury and was replaced by Will Campuzano.

Results

Bonus awards
The following fighters were awarded $50,000 bonuses.

 Fight of The Night: Georges St-Pierre vs. Johny Hendricks
 Knockout of The Night: Tyron Woodley
 Submission of the Night: Donald Cerrone

Reported payout
The following is the reported payout to the fighters as reported to the Nevada State Athletic Commission. It does not include sponsor money and also does not include the UFC's traditional "fight night" bonuses.
 Georges St-Pierre: $400,000 (no win bonus) def. Johny Hendricks: $50,000
 Rashad Evans: $250,000 (includes $125,000 win bonus) def. Chael Sonnen: $100,000
 Robbie Lawler: $166,000 (includes $83,000 win bonus) def. Rory MacDonald: $50,000
 Tyron Woodley: $104,000 (includes $52,000 win bonus) def. Josh Koscheck: $78,000
 Ali Bagautinov: $20,000 (includes $10,000 win bonus) def. Tim Elliott: $12,000
 Donald Cerrone: $96,000 (includes $48,000 win bonus) def. Evan Dunham: $25,000
 Thales Leites: $20,000 (includes $10,000 win bonus) def. Ed Herman: $40,000
 Rick Story: $54,000 (includes $27,000 win bonus) def. Brian Ebersole: $18,000
 Érik Pérez: $36,000 (includes $18,000 win bonus) def. Edwin Figueroa: $12,000
 Jason High: $30,000 (includes $15,000 win bonus) def. Anthony Lapsley: $8,000
 Sergio Pettis: $16,000 (includes $8,000 win bonus) def. Will Campuzano: $10,000
 Gian Villante: $38,000 (includes $19,000 win bonus) def. Cody Donovan: $8,000

See also
List of UFC events
2013 in UFC

References

Ultimate Fighting Championship events
2013 in mixed martial arts
Mixed martial arts in Las Vegas
2013 in sports in Nevada
MGM Grand Garden Arena